The Cane Paratore is a breed of herding dog from Italy, the breed primarily exists in its traditional role in Abruzzo, its historical region of origin, having not gained popularity from outside dog fanciers.

In 2018 a genetic study found that, just prior to 1859, a broadly distributed European herding dog had given rise to the German Shepherd Dog, the French Berger Picard, and the five Italian herding breeds: the Bergamasco Shepherd, Cane Paratore, Lupino del Gigante, Pastore d'Oropa, and the Pastore della Lessinia e del Lagorai.

See also
 Dogs portal
 List of dog breeds

References

External links
Video: Cane Paratore rounding up sheep
Cane Paratore/Toccatore Italiano history: http://www.dicasamarziali.com/en/cane-toccatore-history.html

Dog breeds originating in Italy
Herding dogs
Rare dog breeds